This is a general overview and status of places affected by severe acute respiratory syndrome coronavirus 2 (SARS-CoV-2), the virus which causes coronavirus disease 2019 (COVID-19) and is responsible for the COVID-19 pandemic. The first human cases of COVID-19 were identified in Wuhan, the capital of the province of Hubei in China in December 2019.

The figures presented are based on reported cases and deaths. While in several high-income countries the ratio of total estimated cases and deaths to reported cases and deaths is low and close to 1, for some countries it may be more than 10 or even more than 100. Implementation of COVID-19 surveillance methods varies widely.

Maps and timelines

Total cases 
World maps showing total confirmed cases, and total confirmed cases per million, by country. Data is from the COVID-19 Data Repository by the Center for Systems Science and Engineering (CSSE) at Johns Hopkins University.

Total deaths 
Data is from the COVID-19 Data Repository by the Center for Systems Science and Engineering (CSSE) at Johns Hopkins University.

Daily deaths 
Data for the map and graphs is from the COVID-19 Data Repository by the Center for Systems Science and Engineering (CSSE) at Johns Hopkins University. 7-day rolling average.

Weekly deaths 
Data for the graph is from the COVID-19 Data Repository by the Center for Systems Science and Engineering (CSSE) at Johns Hopkins University.

Total vaccinations 
Data is collated by Our World in Data from figures that are verifiable based on public official sources.

Statistics

Total cases, deaths, and death rates by country 

Data source is Our World in Data.

All columns are cumulative. "Deaths per million" is the number of deaths per million people.

Logarithmic plot of confirmed cases from Our World in Data 
A logarithmic plot of confirmed cases from Our World in Data using roughly the first 12 months of data from the pandemic.

Cumulative monthly death totals by country (World Health Organization) 

The 2022 and 2021 tables below contain the cumulative number of monthly deaths from the pandemic of coronavirus disease 2019 (COVID-19) reported by each country and territory to the World Health Organization (WHO) and published in the WHO's spreadsheets and tables updated daily. See COVID-19 pandemic deaths for tables for all years, and for world maps and graphs.

2022

2021. 2nd half

Cases and deaths by region
Reporting standards vary enormously in different countries. No statistics are particularly accurate, but case and death rates in India (South Asia) and Sub-Saharan Africa in particular are probably much higher than reported.

Vaccinations 

Number and percentage of people who have received at least one dose of a COVID-19 vaccine (unless noted otherwise). May include vaccination of non-citizens, which can push totals beyond 100% of the local population.

By continent

As a result of COVID-19 many regions have imposed lockdowns, curfews, and quarantines alongside new legislation and evacuations, or other restrictions for citizens of or recent travelers to the most affected areas. Other regions have imposed global restrictions that apply to all foreign countries and territories, or prevent their own citizens from travelling overseas.

Africa 

The government of Egypt denied January 2021 allegations that the shortage of oxygen had killed several COVID-19 patients at one of its hospitals. However, an investigation led by The New York Times confirmed that the authorities had lied. The video of one of Egypt's hospitals treating critical patients using manual ventilation methods went viral on Facebook. The video was posted by Ahmed Nafei, the nephew of a 62-year-old woman who died. In addition, the relatives of the dead patients and the El Husseineya Central Hospital's medical staff also confirmed in an interview given to The New York Times that the cause of death had been the shortage of oxygen.

Antarctica

Asia

Europe

North America

Oceania

South America

At sea

Timeline of first confirmed cases by country or territory

Regions with no confirmed cases 
, Turkmenistan in Central Asia is the only sovereign state in the world which has not reported any confirmed cases of COVID-19. Cases are strongly suspected, but none have been officially reported. Private citizens have reported hospitals being overwhelmed with patients showing COVID-19-like symptoms, including a very large outbreak in a women's prison that apparently began September 2020. The Turkmenistan government has instead reported a large increase in atypical pneumonia cases.

The last region in the world to have its first COVID infection was Tokelau, a dependency of New Zealand that reported five cases 21 December 2022.

See also 
COVID-19 pandemic death rates by country

Notes

References

External links

 Center for Disease Control, US data
 COVID-19 Map
 COVID-19 Global Cases and historical data by Johns Hopkins University

 
Country
COVID-19 pandemic
COVID-19 pandemic
COVID-19 pandemic
COVID-19 pandemic